Ocaperidone (R 79598) is a benzisoxazole antipsychotic. It was initially developed by Janssen, later licensed to French laboratory Neuro3D and then acquired in 2007 by German company Evotec. It was found to be more potent than risperidone in animal studies, but its testing was abandoned in 2010 after unfavorable results in human Phase II trials, as while it was effective at controlling symptoms of schizophrenia, ocaperidone produced an unacceptable amount of extrapyramidal side effects.

Synthesis

The last step requires attachment of the sidechain between 3-(2-bromoethyl)-2,9-dimethyl 4H-pyrido[1,2-a]pyrimidin-4-one, CID:18995805 (1) and 6-fluoro-3-(4-piperidinyl)-1,2-benzisoxazole [84163-77-9] (2) completing the convergent synthesis of Ocaperidone (3)..

See also
 Benperidol
 Trifluperidol
 Pirenperone

References

5-HT2 antagonists
Abandoned drugs
Antihistamines
Antipsychotics
Alpha blockers
Benzisoxazoles
D2 antagonists